Memorial Lake State Park is a Pennsylvania state park on  in East Hanover Township, Dauphin County, Pennsylvania in the United States. The park is surrounded by Fort Indiantown Gap Military Reservation, headquarters of the Pennsylvania National Guard.

Memorial Lake State Park was established in 1945 in memory and honor of Pennsylvania National Guard soldiers who served in World War I and World War II. Hiking, picnicking, cross-country skiing, and ice skating are some of the recreational activities available at the park.

Fishing and ice fishing are popular recreational activities at the park. The common game fish are largemouth bass, muskellunge, northern pike, yellow perch, white crappie, black crappie, bullhead, channel catfish, carp, sucker, trout, and various species of panfish. Memorial Lake is a warm water fishery. All rules and regulations of the Pennsylvania Fish and Boat Commission apply.

There are two boat launches at Memorial Lake. Gas powered boats are prohibited. Non powered and electric powered boats must display a current registration from any state or a launch permit from the Pennsylvania Fish and Boat Commission.

Boat rental

Not only does Memorial Lake have multiple boat launches for those with personal boats, there is also a boat rental for those that want to experience boating first hand. Rental boats include Paddle Boats, Fishing Boats, Canoes, Single Kayaks and Tandem Kayaks. Boat rental hours vary by season, detailed information regarding the boat rental can be found at Green Way Outdoors.

Nearby state parks
The following state parks are within  of Memorial Lake State Park:
Boyd Big Tree Preserve Conservation Area (Dauphin County) 
Gifford Pinchot State Park (York County)
Joseph E. Ibberson Conservation Area (Dauphin County)
Samuel S. Lewis State Park (York County)
Swatara State Park (Lebanon and Schuylkill Counties)

References

External links

  

State parks of Pennsylvania
Protected areas established in 1945
Parks in Lebanon County, Pennsylvania
Protected areas of Lebanon County, Pennsylvania